Edward (18 March 978), often called the Martyr, was King of the English from 975 until he was murdered in 978. Edward was the eldest son of King Edgar, but was not his father's acknowledged heir. On Edgar's death, the leadership of England was contested, with some supporting Edward's claim to be king and others supporting his younger half-brother Æthelred, recognised as a legitimate son of Edgar. Edward was chosen as king and was crowned by his main clerical supporters, the archbishops Dunstan of Canterbury and Oswald of York.

The great nobles of the kingdom, ealdormen Ælfhere and Æthelwine, quarrelled, and civil war almost broke out. In the so-called anti-monastic reaction, the nobles took advantage of Edward's weakness to dispossess the Benedictine reformed monasteries of lands and other properties that King Edgar had granted to them.

Edward's short reign was brought to an end by his murder at Corfe in 978 in circumstances that are not altogether clear. He was hurriedly buried at Wareham, but was reburied with great ceremony at Shaftesbury Abbey in Dorset early in 979. In 1001 Edward's remains were moved to a more prominent place in the abbey, probably with the blessing of his half-brother King Æthelred. Edward was already reckoned a saint by this time.

A number of lives of Edward were written in the centuries following his death in which he was portrayed as a martyr, generally seen as a victim of the Queen Dowager Ælfthryth, mother of Æthelred. He is today recognised as a saint in the Catholic Church, the Eastern Orthodox Church, and the Anglican Communion.

Family
Edward's date of birth is unknown, but he was the eldest of King Edgar's three children. He was probably in his teens when he succeeded his father, who died at age 32 in 975. Edward was known to be King Edgar's son, but he was not the son of Queen Ælfthryth, the third wife of Edgar. This much and no more is known from contemporary charters.

Later sources of questionable reliability address the identity of Edward's mother. The earliest such source is a life of Dunstan by Osbern of Canterbury, probably written in the 1080s. Osbern writes that Edward's mother was a nun at Wilton Abbey whom the king seduced. When Eadmer wrote a life of Dunstan some decades later, he included an account of Edward's parentage obtained from Nicholas of Worcester. This denied that Edward was the son of a liaison between Edgar and a nun, presenting him as the son of Æthelflæd, daughter of Ordmær, "ealdorman of the East Anglians", whom Edgar had married in the years when he ruled Mercia (between 957 and Eadwig's death in 959). Additional accounts are offered by Goscelin in his life of Edgar's daughter Saint Edith of Wilton and in the histories of John of Worcester and William of Malmesbury. Together these various accounts suggest that Edward's mother was probably a noblewoman named Æthelflæd, surnamed Candida or Eneda—"the White" or "White Duck".

A charter of 966 describes Ælfthryth, whom Edgar had married in 964, as the king's "lawful wife", and their eldest son Edmund as the legitimate son of the king. Edward is noted as the king's son. Bishop Æthelwold of Winchester was a supporter of Ælfthryth and Æthelred, but Dunstan, the Archbishop of Canterbury, appears to have supported Edward, and a genealogy created at his Glastonbury Abbey circa 969 gives Edward precedence over Edmund and Æthelred.  Ælfthryth was the widow of Æthelwald, Ealdorman of East Anglia, and perhaps Edgar's third wife.  Cyril Hart argues that the contradictions regarding the identity of Edward's mother, and the fact that Edmund appears to have been regarded as the legitimate heir until his death in 971, suggest that Edward was probably illegitimate. However, Barbara Yorke thinks that Æthelflæd was Edgar's wife, but Ælfthryth was a consecrated queen when she gave birth to her sons, who were therefore considered more "legitimate" than Edward. Æthelwold denied that Edward was legitimate, but Yorke considers this "opportunist special pleading".

Edmund's full brother Æthelred may have inherited his position as heir. On a charter to the New Minster at Winchester, the names of Ælfthryth and her son Æthelred appear ahead of Edward's name. When Edgar died on 8 July 975, Æthelred was probably nine and Edward only a few years older.

Disputed succession
Edgar had been a strong ruler who had forced monastic reforms on a probably unwilling church and nobility, aided by the leading clerics of the day, Dunstan, Archbishop of Canterbury; Oswald of Worcester, Archbishop of York; and Bishop Æthelwold of Winchester. By endowing the reformed Benedictine monasteries with the lands required for their support, he had dispossessed many lesser nobles, and had rewritten leases and loans of land to the benefit of the monasteries. Secular clergy, many of whom would have been members of the nobility, had been expelled from the new monasteries. While Edgar lived, he strongly supported the reformers, but following his death, the discontents which these changes had provoked came into the open.

The leading figures had all been supporters of the reform, but they were no longer united. Relations between Archbishop Dunstan and Bishop Æthelwold may have been strained. Archbishop Oswald was at odds with Ealdorman Ælfhere, Ealdorman of Mercia, while Ælfhere and his kin were rivals for power with the affinity of Æthelwine, Ealdorman of East Anglia. Dunstan was said to have questioned Edgar's marriage to Queen Dowager Ælfthryth and the legitimacy of their son Æthelred.

These leaders were divided as to whether Edward or Æthelred should succeed Edgar. Neither law nor precedent offered much guidance. The choice between the sons of Edward the Elder had divided his kingdom, and Edgar's elder brother Eadwig had been forced to give over a large part of the kingdom to Edgar. The Queen Dowager certainly supported the claims of her son Æthelred, aided by Bishop Æthelwold; and Dunstan supported Edward, aided by his fellow archbishop Oswald. It is likely that Ealdorman Ælfhere and his allies supported Æthelred and that Æthelwine and his allies supported Edward, although some historians suggest the opposite.

Later sources suggest that perceptions of legitimacy played a part in the arguments, as did the relative age of the two candidates. In time, Edward was anointed by Archbishops Dunstan and Oswald at Kingston upon Thames, most likely in 975. There is evidence that the settlement involved a degree of compromise. Æthelred appears to have been given lands which normally belonged to the king's sons, some of which had been granted by Edgar to Abingdon Abbey and which were forcibly repossessed for Æthelred by the leading nobles.

Edward's reign

After recording Edward's succession, the Anglo-Saxon Chronicle reports that a comet appeared, and that famine and "manifold disturbances" followed. The "manifold disturbances", sometimes called the anti-monastic reaction, appear to have started soon after Edgar's death. During this time, the experienced Ealdorman Oslac of Northumbria, effective ruler of much of northern England, was exiled due to unknown circumstances. Oslac was followed as ealdorman by Thored, either Oslac's son of that name or Thored Gunnar's son mentioned by the Chronicle in 966.

Edward, or rather those who were wielding power on his behalf, also appointed a number of new ealdormen to positions in Wessex. Little is known of two of these men, and it is difficult to determine which faction, if any, they belonged to. Edwin, probably ruling in Sussex, and perhaps also parts of Kent and Surrey, was buried at Abingdon, an abbey patronised by Ælfhere. Æthelmær, who oversaw Hampshire, held lands in Rutland, perhaps suggesting links to Æthelwine.

The third ealdorman, Æthelweard, today best known for his Latin history, ruled in the west. Æthelweard was a descendant of King Æthelred of Wessex and probably the brother of King Eadwig's wife. He appears to have been a supporter of Edward rather than of either faction.

In some places, the secular clergy who had been removed from the monasteries returned, driving the regular clergy out in their turn. Bishop Æthelwold had been the main supporter of the regulars, and Archbishop Dunstan appears to have done little to aid his fellow reformer at this time. More generally, the magnates took the opportunity to undo many of Edgar's grants to monasteries and to force the abbots to rewrite leases and loans to favour the local nobility. Ealdorman Ælfhere was the leader in this regard, attacking Oswald's network of monasteries across Mercia. Ælfhere's rival Æthelwine, while a staunch protector of his family monastery of Ramsey Abbey, treated Ely Abbey and other monasteries harshly. At some point during these disorders, Ælfhere and Æthelwine appear to have come close to open warfare. This may well have been related to Ælfhere's ambitions in East Anglia and to attacks upon Ramsey Abbey. Æthelwine, supported by his kinsman Ealdorman Byrhtnoth of Essex and others unspecified, mustered an army and caused Ælfhere to back down.

Very few charters survive from Edward's reign, perhaps as few as three, leaving Edward's brief reign in obscurity.  By contrast, numerous charters survived from the reigns of his father Edgar and half-brother Æthelred.  All of the surviving Edward charters concern the royal heartland of Wessex; two deal with Crediton where Edward's former tutor Sideman was bishop. During Edgar's reign, dies for coins were cut only at Winchester and distributed from there to other mints across the kingdom.  Edward's reign permitted dies to be cut locally at York and at Lincoln. The general impression is of a reduction or breakdown of royal authority in the midlands and north. The machinery of government continued to function, as councils and synods met as customary during Edward's reign, at Kirtlington in Oxfordshire after Easter 977, and again at Calne in Wiltshire the following year. During the meeting at Calne, some councillors were killed and others injured by the collapse of the floor of their room.

Death

The version of the Anglo-Saxon Chronicle containing the most detailed account records that Edward was murdered in the evening of 18 March 978, while visiting Ælfthryth and Æthelred, probably at or near the mound on which the ruins of Corfe Castle now stand. It adds that he was buried at Wareham "without any royal honours". The compiler of this version of the Chronicle, manuscript E, called the Peterborough Chronicle, says:

"No worse deed for the English race was done than this was, since they first sought out the land of Britain. Men murdered him, but God exalted him. In life he was an earthly king; after death he is now a heavenly saint. His earthly relatives would not avenge him, but his Heavenly Father has much avenged him."

Other recensions of the Chronicle report less detail, the oldest text stating only that he was killed, while versions from the 1040s say that he was martyred.

Of other early sources, the life of Oswald of Worcester, attributed to Byrhtferth of Ramsey, adds that Edward was killed by Æthelred's advisers, who attacked him when he was dismounting. It agrees that he was buried without ceremony at Wareham. Archbishop Wulfstan II alludes to the killing of Edward in his Sermo Lupi ad Anglos, written not later than 1016. A recent study translates his words as follows:

"And a very great betrayal of a lord it is also in the world, that a man betray his lord to death, or drive him living from the land, and both have come to pass in this land: Edward was betrayed, and then killed, and after that burned ..."

Later sources, further removed from events, such as the late 11th-century Passio S. Eadwardi and John of Worcester, claim that Ælfthryth organised the killing of Edward, while Henry of Huntingdon wrote that she killed Edward herself.

Modern historians have offered a variety of interpretations of Edward's killing. Three main theories have been proposed. Firstly, that Edward was killed, as the life of Oswald claims, by nobles in Æthelred's service, either as a result of a personal quarrel, or to place their master on the throne. The life of Oswald portrays Edward as an unstable young man who, according to Frank Stenton: "had offended many important persons by his intolerable violence of speech and behaviour. Long after he had passed into veneration as a saint it was remembered that his outbursts of rage had alarmed all who knew him, and especially the members of his own household."  This may be a trope of hagiography.

In the second version, Ælfthryth was implicated, either beforehand by plotting the killing, or afterwards in allowing the killers to go free and unpunished.

A third alternative, noting that Edward in 978 was very close to ruling on his own, proposes that Ealdorman Ælfhere was behind the killing so as to preserve his own influence and to prevent Edward taking revenge for Ælfhere's actions earlier in the reign. John notes this and interprets Ælfhere's part in Edward's reburial as being a penance for the assassination.

Reburial and early cult

Edward's body lay at Wareham for a year before being disinterred. Ælfhere initiated the reinterment, perhaps as a gesture of reconciliation. According to the life of Oswald, Edward's body was found to be incorrupt when it was disinterred (which was taken as a miraculous sign). The body was taken to Shaftesbury Abbey, a Benedictine house of nuns, with royal connections which had been endowed by King Alfred the Great and where Edward and Æthelred's grandmother Ælfgifu had spent her latter years.

Edward's remains were reburied with lavish public ceremony. Later versions, such as the Passio S. Eadwardi, have more complicated accounts.  It said that Edward's body was concealed in a marsh, where it was revealed by miraculous events. The Passio dates the reburial to 18 February.

In 1001, Edward's relics (he was considered a saint, although never canonised) were translated to a more prominent place within the abbey church at Shaftesbury. The ceremonies are said to have been led by the then-Bishop of Sherborne, Wulfsige III, accompanied by a senior cleric whom the Passio calls Elsinus, sometimes identified with Ælfsige, the abbot of the New Minster, Winchester. King Æthelred, preoccupied with the threat of a Danish invasion, did not attend in person, but he issued a charter to the Shaftesbury nuns late in 1001 granting them lands at Bradford on Avon, which is thought to be related. A 13th-century calendar of saints gives the date of this translation as 20 June.

The rise of Edward's cult has been interpreted in various ways. It is sometimes portrayed as a popular movement, or as the product of a political attack on King Æthelred by former supporters of Edward. Alternatively, Æthelred has been seen as one of the key forces in the promotion of Edward's cult and that of their sister Eadgifu (Edith of Wilton). He was thought to make the charter in 1001 granting land to Shaftesbury at the elevation of Edward's relics, and some accounts suggest that Æthelred legislated the observance of Edward's feast days across England in a law code of 1008. It is unclear whether this innovation, seemingly drafted by Archbishop Wulfstan II, dates from Æthelred's reign.  It may instead have been promulgated by King Cnut. David Rollason has drawn attention to the increased importance of the cults of other murdered royal saints in this period. Among these are the cults of King Ecgberht of Kent's nephews, whose lives form part of the Mildrith Legend, and those of the Mercian Saints Kenelm and Wigstan.

Later cult

During the sixteenth century and English Reformation, King Henry VIII led the dissolution of the monasteries and many holy places were demolished.  Edward's remains were hidden so as to avoid desecration.

In 1931, the relics were recovered by Wilson-Claridge during an archaeological excavation at Shaftesbury abbey ruins; their identity was confirmed by Dr. T. E. A. Stowell, an osteologist. In 1970, examinations performed on the relics suggested that the young man had died in the same manner as Edward.  Wilson-Claridge wanted the relics to go to the Russian Orthodox Church Outside Russia. His brother, however, wanted them to be returned to Shaftesbury Abbey. For decades, the relics were kept in a cutlery box in a bank vault at the Midland Bank in Woking, Surrey because of the unresolved dispute about which of two churches should have them.

In time, the Russian Orthodox Church Outside Russia was granted the remains, and they were placed in a church in Brookwood Cemetery in Woking, with the enshrinement ceremony occurring in September 1984. The St Edward Brotherhood of monks was organised there as well. The church is now named St Edward the Martyr Orthodox Church, and it is under the jurisdiction of a traditionalist Greek Orthodox community. However, while the bones are of approximately the right date, they are of a man in his late twenties or early thirties rather than a youth in his mid teens.

In the Orthodox Church, St Edward is ranked as a Passion-bearer, a type of saint who accepts death out of love for Christ. Edward was widely venerated before the canonisation process was formalised, and he is also regarded as a saint in the Eastern Orthodox Church, the Catholic Church and the Anglican Communion. His feast day is celebrated on 18 March, the day of his murder. The Orthodox Church commemorates him a second time each year on 3 September and commemorates the translation of his relics into Orthodox possession on 13 February.

See also
House of Wessex family tree
List of Catholic saints

Notes

Footnotes

Citations

References

Further reading

External links

 Edward the Martyr at the official website of the British monarchy
 

 
 

960s births
978 deaths
Year of birth uncertain
10th-century Christian martyrs
10th-century Christian saints
10th-century English monarchs
10th-century murdered monarchs
Monarchs who died as children
Burials at Brookwood Cemetery
History of Dorset
Medieval child monarchs
Monarchs of England before 1066
Passion bearers
Christian royal saints
Roman Catholic royal saints
West Saxon saints
House of Wessex